Le Roux Malan (born 31 March 1999) is an Namibian rugby union player, currently playing for the . His preferred position is centre.

Early career
Born in Windhoek, Namibia, Malan attended Paarl Boys' High School and then attended the University of Cape Town where he represented the Ikey Tigers side in the Varsity Cup.

Professional career
He signed for the New England Free Jacks ahead of the 2022 Major League Rugby season.

In late 2022, he was selected for the Namibia national side, and made his debut against Spain.

References

External links
itsrugby.co.uk Profile

1999 births
Living people
Namibian rugby union players
Namibia international rugby union players
Rugby union centres
Sharks (Currie Cup) players
New England Free Jacks players
Rugby union players from Windhoek